Ara Town is a town found in Nasarawa Local Government Area  of Nasarawa State in central Nigeria.
The town is found in the western part of Nasarawa state with the Federal Capital Territory of Nigeria (FCT) border passing by the western part of the town. The town is found about 220 km away from the state capital, Lafia.

Tourism 
Ara Town is home to the Ara Rock which stands facing the town, and is a popular tourist attraction.

References 

Populated places in Nasarawa State